Danse Macabre is a late-medieval allegory of the universality of death.

Danse Macabre or Dance Macabre may also refer to:

Film and television 
 Danse Macabre, a 1922 film directed by Dudley Murphy
 Dance Macabre (film), a 1992 American horror film
 Danse Macabre (film), a 2009 Canadian short drama film
 "Danse Macabre" (Grimm), a television episode
 "Danse Macabre" (Jonathan Creek), a television episode

Literature and art 
 Danse Macabre (book), a 1981 nonfiction book by Stephen King
 Danse Macabre (novel), a 2006 novel by Laurell K. Hamilton
 Danse Macabre (Notke), a 15th-century painting by Bernt Notke

Music 
 Danse macabre (Saint-Saëns), a tone poem for orchestra composed by Camille Saint-Saëns
 Cortège & Danse Macabre, a symphonic poem from Frederik Magle's Cantabile suite
 Danse Macabre Records, a German record label
 Danse Macabre (album), by The Faint, 2001
 "Dance Macabre" (song), by Ghost, 2018
 "Danse Macabre", a song by The Agonist from Eye of Providence
 "Danse Macabre", a song by Celtic Frost from Morbid Tales
 "Danse Macabre", a song by Dead End
 "Dance Macabre", a song by Decapitated from Winds of Creation

Other uses
 Danse Macabre, a planned haunted attraction at Efteling in Kaatsheuvel, the Netherlands

See also
 Danza macabra or Castle of Blood, a 1964 horror film
 La Grande Danse Macabre, a 2001 album by Marduk
 Dance of Death (disambiguation)
 Dance of the Dead (disambiguation)
 Totentanz (disambiguation)